"Cry Baby" is a song originally recorded by Garnet Mimms and the Enchanters, in 1963, and later recorded by rock singer Janis Joplin in 1970. 
Bert Berns wrote the song with Jerry Ragovoy.  Garnet Mimms and the Enchanters recorded it for the United Artists record label. It topped the R&B chart and went to #4 on the Billboard Hot 100 chart in 1963, paving the way for soul hits by Aretha Franklin and Otis Redding later in the decade. The third verse was spoken by Mimms until the repeated refrain of the repeated song title.

Janis Joplin version

In September and October 1970, Janis Joplin recorded it for her album Pearl, posthumously released in 1971. The song was in more of a blues-rock style and produced by Paul A. Rothchild. Her rendition reached #42 on the US Billboard Hot 100, and #20 on Cash Box.  On the single, the B-side was the track, "Mercedes Benz".

The song became usual in Joplin's repertoire and today is often performed by many artists such as Joss Stone, Allison Iraheta, Magdolna Rúzsa.

References

External links
Yo 'American Idol' judges: 'Cry Baby' props belong to Garnet Mimms, not Janis Joplin from Daily News, 6 May 2009

1963 singles
1971 singles
Janis Joplin songs
Songs written by Bert Berns
Songs written by Jerry Ragovoy
1963 songs
United Artists Records singles
Columbia Records singles
Song recordings produced by Bert Berns
Song recordings produced by Paul A. Rothchild